Luigi De Rosso (5 May 1935 – 28 April 2020) was an Italian male racewalker who competed at the 1960 Summer Olympics.

See also
 Italian team at the running events
 Italy at the IAAF World Race Walking Cup

References

External links
 

1935 births
2020 deaths
Athletes (track and field) at the 1960 Summer Olympics
Italian male racewalkers
Olympic athletes of Italy
Athletics competitors of Fiamme Oro